Carlos Phillipe "Tim" Griesenbeck (December 10, 1897 – March 25, 1953) was a Major League Baseball catcher who played for the St. Louis Cardinals in . Griesenbeck attended the Agricultural and Mechanical College of Texas—now known as Texas A&M University, where he lettered in baseball and football. He served as the head football and basketball coach at St. Mary's University, located in San Antonio, Texas, for one season, in 1927.

Basketball

References

External links
 

1897 births
1953 deaths
Major League Baseball catchers
St. Louis Cardinals players
Texas A&M Aggies baseball players
Texas A&M Aggies football players
St. Mary's Rattlers football coaches
Players of American football from San Antonio
Baseball players from San Antonio